Gilmar Antônio Batista (born 16 May 1970 in São Paulo) is a Brazilian retired professional association football player.

Playing career 
Gilmar was signed by MetroStars, on loan, as a replacement for Clint Mathis in 2001.

Statistics

References

External links 
 Profile on MetroFanatic
 

1970 births
Living people
Footballers from São Paulo
Brazilian footballers
Brazilian expatriate footballers
Association football forwards
Associação Desportiva São Caetano players
Tampa Bay Mutiny players
Major League Soccer players
New York Red Bulls players
Expatriate soccer players in the United States